Bernard Epstein (10 August 1920, Harrison, New Jersey – 30 March 2005, Montgomery County, Maryland) was an American mathematician and physicist who wrote several widely used textbooks on mathematics.

Epstein was the son of Jewish immigrants from Lithuania and Romania, Yitzkhak Aharon Epstein and Sophie-Sarah née Goldenberg, and was the first person in his family to go to college. He received bachelor's and master's degrees in mathematics and physics from New York University and then in 1947 a Ph.D. in applied mathematics, with thesis advisor Maurice Heins, from Brown University with thesis Method for the Solution of the Dirichlet Problem for Certain Types of Domains.

In the early 1940s, he worked as a physicist at what is now the National Institute of Standards and Technology. During World War II, he was selected to join the Manhattan Project, which produced the first atomic bombs. After the war, he worked for two years at Harvard University as a research associate, taught mathematics as an associate professor at the University of Pennsylvania, Stanford University and NYU and as a professor at Yeshiva University and then spent 21 years on the faculty of the University of New Mexico as a professor of mathematics until his retirement in 1984.

Sabbaticals included Office of Naval Research, London; The Technion in Haifa, Israel; University of Maryland; and Air Force Office of Scientific Research. After retirement, he taught at George Mason University.

Epstein was dissertation advisor for the following Ph.D. students:
Anne Scheerer, University of Pennsylvania, 1953 
William Trench, University of Pennsylvania, 1958 
Jack Minker, University of Pennsylvania, 1959 
Edwin Sherry, Yeshiva University, 1964 
Darrell L. Hicks, University of New Mexico, 1969 
Harvey Z. Senter, Yeshiva University 

Upon his death at age 84, he was survived by his wife, five children, and 16 grandchildren. His sixth child, a daughter, predeceased him.

Selected publications

Articles
 
 
 with S. Bergman: 
 with J. Lehner: 
 with A. Scheerer:  
 with David S. Greenstein and Jack Minker: "An extremal problem with infinitely many interpolation conditions". Annals of Finnish Academy of  Science (Soumalainen  Tiedaekatamia Tomituksia), Series A:1 Mathematics 250/10, 1958.
 with F. Haber: 
 
 with I. J. Schoenberg: 
 with J. Minker: 
 
 
 with M. M. Schiffer: 
 
 with H. Senter: 
 with J. R. Blum:

Books
 

 
with Liang-shin Hahn:

References

1920 births
2005 deaths
20th-century American mathematicians
20th-century American physicists
American expatriates in the United Kingdom
American expatriates in Israel
American mathematicians
American people of Lithuanian-Jewish descent
American people of Romanian-Jewish descent
American physicists
Brown University alumni
Jewish American scientists
Jewish physicists
Manhattan Project people
Mathematics writers
New York University alumni
People from Harrison, New Jersey
University of New Mexico faculty
University of Pennsylvania faculty